The Pallava dynasty existed from 275 CE to 897 CE, ruling a significant portion of the Deccan, also known as Tondaimandalam. The dynasty rose to prominence after the downfall of the Satavahana dynasty, with whom they had formerly served as feudatories.

The Pallavas became a major South Indian power during the reign of Mahendravarman I (600–630 CE) and Narasimhavarman I (630–668 CE), and dominated the southern Andhra Region and the northern parts of the Tamil region for about 600 years, until the end of the 9th century. Throughout their reign, they remained in constant conflict with both the Chalukyas of Badami in the north, and the Tamil kingdoms of Chola and Pandyas in the south. The Pallavas were finally defeated by the Chola ruler Aditya I in the 9th century CE.

The Pallavas are most noted for their patronage of Hindu temple architecture, the finest example being the Shore Temple, a UNESCO World Heritage Site in Mamallapuram. Kancheepuram served as the capital of the Pallava kingdom. The dynasty left behind magnificent sculptures and temples, and are recognised to have established the foundations of medieval South Indian architecture, which some scholars believe the ancient Hindu treatise Manasara inspired. They developed the Pallava script,  from which Grantha ultimately took form. This script eventually gave rise to several other Southeast Asian scripts such Khmer. The Chinese traveller Xuanzang visited Kanchipuram during Pallava rule and extolled their benign rule.

Etymology 
The word Pallava means a creeper or branch in Sanskrit. Pallava also means arrow or spruce in Tamil.

Origins

The origins of the Pallavas have been debated by scholars. The available historical materials include three copper-plate grants of Sivaskandavarman in the first quarter of the 4th century CE, all issued from Kanchipuram but found in various parts of Andhra Pradesh, and another inscription of Simhavarman I half century earlier in the Palnadu (Pallava Nadu) area of the western Guntur district. All the early documents are in Prakrit, and scholars find similarities in paleography and language with the Satavahanas and the Mauryas. Their early coins are said to be similar to those of Satavahanas. Two main theories of the origins have emerged from this data: one that the Pallavas were former subsidiaries of Satavahanas in the Andhradesa (the region north of Penna River in modern Andhra Pradesh) and later expanded south up to Kanchi, and the other that they initially rose to power in Kanchi and expanded north up to the Krishna river, and the other that they are Dependent from Chola Prince Ilandiraiyan ad native to Tondaimandalam

S. Krishnaswami Aiyangar and K. A. Nilakanta Sastri believe that Pallavas were originally from Tondaimandalam and were feudatories of the Satavahanas in the south-eastern part of their empire who became independent when the Satavahana power declined. 

S. Krishnaswami Aiyengar also speculates that the Pallavas were natives of Tondaimandalam and the name Pallava is identical with the word Tondaiyar. Chola Prince Ilandiraiyan is traditionally regarded as the founder of the Pallava dynasty. Ilandiraiyan is referred to in the literature of the Sangam period such as the Pathupattu. In the Sangam epic Manimekalai, he is depected as the son of Chola king Killi and the Naga princess Pilivalai, the daughter of king Valaivanan of Manipallavam.

Another theory is propounded by historians R. Sathianathaier and D. C. Sircar, with endorsements by Hermann Kulke, Dietmar Rothermund and Burton Stein. Sircar points out that the family legends of the Pallavas speak of an ancestor descending from Ashwatthama, the legendary warrior of Mahabharata, and his union with a Naga princess. According to Ptolemy, the Aruvanadu region between the northern and southern Penner rivers (Penna and Ponnaiyar) was ruled by a king Basaronaga around 140 CE. By marrying into this Naga family, the Pallavas would have acquired control of the region near Kanchi. While Sircar allows that Pallavas might have been provincial rulers under the later Satavahanas with a partial northern lineage, Sathianathaier sees them as natives of Tondaimandalam (the core region of Aruvanadu). He argues that they could well have adopted north Indian practices under the Mauryan Asoka's rule. He relates the name "Pallava" to Pulindas, whose heritage is borne by names such as "Pulinadu" and "Puliyurkottam" in the region.

According to Sir H. A. Stuart the Pallavas were Kurumbas and Kurubas their modern representatives. This is supported by Marathi historian R. C. Dhere who stated that Pallavas were originally pastoralists that belonged to Kuruba lineages. The territory of Pallavas was bordered by the Coromandel Coast along present Tamil Nadu and southern Andhra Pradesh. Out of the coins found here, the class of gold and silver coins belonging to the 2nd-7th century CE period contain the Pallava emblem, the maned lion, together with Kannada or Sanskrit inscription which showed that the Pallavas used Kannada too in their administration along with Prakrit, Sanskrit and Tamil.

According to C. V. Vaidya, the Pallavas were Maharashtrian Aryans who spoke Maharashtri Prakrit for centuries and hence retained it even in the midst of surrounding Dravidian languages. They may even be said to have been 'Marathas' for their name was said to be still preserved in the Maratha family name of 'Pālave' (which is just Prakrit form of Pallava). And a further corroboration is that the gotra of the Pālave Maratha family is Bharadwaja, same as the one which Pallavas have attributed to themselves in their records.

Overlaid on these theories is another hypothesis of Sathianathaier which claims that "Pallava" is a derivative of Pahlava (the Sanskrit term for Parthians). According to him, partial support for the theory can be derived from a crown shaped like an elephant's scalp depicted on some sculptures, which seems to resemble the crown of Demetrius I.

Rivalries

With Cholas

The Pallavas captured Kanchi from the Cholas as recorded in the Velurpalaiyam Plates, around the reign of the fifth king of the Pallava line Kumaravishnu I. Thereafter Kanchi figures in inscriptions as the capital of the Pallavas. The Cholas drove the Pallavas away from Kanchi in the mid-4th century, in the reign of Vishnugopa, the tenth king of the Pallava line. The Pallavas re-captured Kanchi from the Kalabhras in the mid-6th century, possibly in the reign of Simhavishnu, the fourteenth king of the Pallava line, whom the Kasakudi plates state as "the lion of the earth". Thereafter the Pallavas held on to Kanchi until the 9th century, until the reign of their last king, Vijaya-Nripatungavarman.

With Kadambas
The Pallavas were in conflict with major kingdoms at various periods of time. A contest for political supremacy existed between the early Pallavas and the Kadambas. Numerous Kadamba inscriptions provide details of Pallava-Kadamba hostilities.

With Kalabhras
During the reign of Vishnugopavarman II (approx. 500–525), political convulsion engulfed the Pallavas due to the Kalabhra invasion of the Tamil country. Towards the close of the 6th century, the Pallava Simhavishnu stuck a blow against the Kalabhras. The Pandyas followed suit. Thereafter the Tamil country was divided between the Pallavas in the north with Kanchipuram as their capital, and Pandyas in the south with Madurai as their capital.

Birudas
The royal custom of using a series of descriptive honorific titles, Birudas, was particularly prevalent among the Pallavas. The birudas of Mahendravarman I are in Sanskrit, Tamil and Telugu. The Telugu birudas show Mahendravarman's involvement with the Andhra region continued to be strong at the time he was creating his cave-temples in the Tamil region. The suffix "Malla" was used by the Pallava rulers. Mahendravarman I used the biruda, Shatrumalla, "a warrior who overthrows his enemies", and his grandson Paramesvara I was called Ekamalla "the sole warrior or wrestler". Pallava kings, presumably exalted ones, were known by the title Mahamalla ("great wrestler").

Languages used

Pallava inscriptions have been found in Sanskrit, Prakrit and Tamil.

Sanskrit and Prakrit were main languages used by the Pallavas in their inscriptions, though a few records continued to be in Tamil. At the time of the time of Paramesvaravarman I, the practice came into vogue of inscribing a part of the record in Sanskrit and the rest in Tamil. Almost all the copper plate records, viz., Kasakudi, Tandantottam, Pattattalmangalm, Udayendiram and Velurpalaiyam are composed both in Sanskrit and Tamil.

Many Pallava royal inscriptions were in Sanskrit or Prakrit, considered the official languages. Similarly, inscriptions found in Andhra Pradesh and Karnataka State are in Sanskrit and Prakrit. Sanskrit was widely used by Simhavishnu and Narasimhavarman II in literature. The phenomenon of using Prakrit as official languages in which rulers left their inscriptions and epigraphies continued till the 6th century. It would have been in the interest of the ruling elite to protect their privileges by perpetuating their hegemony of Prakrit in order to exclude the common people from sharing power (Mahadevan 1995a: 173–188). The Pallavas in their Tamil country used Tamil and Sanskrit in their inscriptions.

Writing system

Under the Pallava dynasty, a unique form of Grantha script, a descendant of Pallava script which is a type of Brahmic script, was used. Around the 6th century, it was exported eastwards and influenced the genesis of almost all Southeast Asian scripts.

Religion
Pallavas were followers of Hinduism and made gifts of land to gods and Brahmins. In line with the prevalent customs, some of the rulers performed the Aswamedha and other Vedic sacrifices. They were, however, tolerant of other faiths. The Chinese monk Xuanzang who visited Kanchipuram during the reign of Narasimhavarman I reported that there were 100 Buddhist monasteries, and 80 Hindu temples in Kanchipuram. The semi-legendary founder of Zen Buddhism, Bodhidharma, may have been a son of a Pallava king.

Pallava architecture
The Pallavas were instrumental in the transition from rock-cut architecture to stone temples. The earliest examples of Pallava constructions are rock-cut temples dating from 610 to 690 and structural temples between 690 and 900. A number of rock-cut cave temples bear the inscription of the Pallava king, Mahendravarman I and his successors.

Among the accomplishments of the Pallava architecture are the rock-cut temples at Mamallapuram. There are excavated pillared halls and monolithic shrines known as Rathas in Mahabalipuram. Early temples were mostly dedicated to Shiva. The Kailasanatha temple in Kanchipuram and the Shore Temple built by Narasimhavarman II, rock cut temple in Mahendravadi by Mahendravarman are fine examples of the Pallava style temples. The temple of Nalanda Gedige in Kandy, Sri Lanka is another. The famous Tondeswaram temple of Tenavarai and the ancient Koneswaram temple of Trincomalee were patronised and structurally developed by the Pallavas in the 7th century.

Pallava society
The Pallava period beginning with Simhavishnu (575 CE900 CE) was a transitional stage in southern Indian society with monument building, foundation of devotional (bhakti) sects of Alvars and Nayanars, the flowering of rural Brahmanical institutions of Sanskrit learning, and the establishment of chakravartin model of kingship over a territory of diverse people; which ended the pre-Pallavan era of territorially segmented people, each with their culture, under a tribal chieftain. While a system of ranked relationship among groups existed in the classical period, the Pallava period extolled ranked relationships based on ritual purity as enjoined by the shastras. Burton distinguishes between the chakravatin model and the kshatriya model, and likens kshatriyas to locally based warriors with ritual status sufficiently high enough to share with Brahmins; and states that in south India the kshatriya model did not emerge. As per Burton, south India was aware of the Indo-Aryan varna organised society in which decisive secular authority was vested in the kshatriyas; but apart from the Pallava, Chola and Vijayanagar line of warriors which claimed chakravartin status, only few locality warrior families achieved the prestigious kin-linked organisation of northern warrior groups.

Chronology

Sastri chronology

The earliest documentation on the Pallavas is the three copper-plate grants, now referred to as the Mayidavolu (from Maidavolu village in Guntur district of Andhra Pradesh), Hirehadagali (from Hire Hadagali of Karnataka) and the British Museum plates (Durga Prasad, 1988) belonging to Skandavarman I and written in Prakrit. Skandavarman appears to have been the first great ruler of the early Pallavas, though there are references to other early Pallavas who were probably predecessors of Skandavarman. Skandavarman extended his dominions from the Krishna in the north to the Pennar in the south and to the Bellary district in the West. He performed the Aswamedha and other Vedic sacrifices and bore the title of "Supreme King of Kings devoted to dharma".

The Hirahadagali copper plate (Bellary District) record in Prakrit is dated in the eighth year of Sivaskanda Varman to 283 CE and confirms the gift made by his father who is described merely as "Bappa-deva" (revered father) or Boppa. It will thus be clear that this dynasty of the Prakrit charters beginning with "Bappa-deva" were the historical founders of the Pallava dominion in South India.

The Hirahadagalli Plates were found in Hirehadagali, Bellary district and is one of the earliest copper plates in Karnataka and belongs to the reign of early Pallava ruler Shivaskanda Varma. Pallava King Sivaskandavarman of Kanchi of the early Pallavas ruled from 275 to 300 CE, and issued the charter in 283 CE in the eighth year of his reign.

As per the Hirahadagalli Plates of 283 CE, Pallava King Sivaskandavarman granted an immunity viz the garden of Chillarekakodumka, which was formerly given by Lord Bappa to the Brahmins, freeholders of Chillarekakodumka and inhabitants of Apitti. Chillarekakodumka has been identified by some as ancient village Chillarige in Bellary, Karnataka.

In the reign of Simhavarman II, who ascended the throne in 436, the territories lost to the Vishnukundins in the north up to the mouth of the Krishna were recovered. The early Pallava history from this period onwards is furnished by a dozen or so copper-plate grants in Sanskrit. They are all dated in the regnal years of the kings. 

The following chronology was composed from these charters by Nilakanta Sastri in his A History of South India:

Early Pallavas

 Simhavarman I (275–300)
 Shivskandvarman (unknown) 
 Vijayskandavarman (unknown) 
 Skandavarman (unknown)
 Vishnugopa I (350–355)
 Kumaravishnu I (350–370)
 Skandavarman II (370–385)
 Viravarman (385–400)
 Skandavarman III (400–436)
 Simhavarman II (436–460)
 Skandavarman IV (460–480)
 Nandivarman I (480–510)
 Kumaravishnu II (510–530)
 Buddhavarman (530–540)
 Kumaravishnu III (540–550)
 Simhavarman III (550–560)

Later Pallavas

The incursion of the Kalabhras and the confusion in the Tamil country was broken by the Pandya Kadungon and the Pallava Simhavishnu. Mahendravarman I extended the Pallava Kingdom and was one of the greatest sovereigns. Some of the most ornate monuments and temples in southern India, carved out of solid rock, were introduced under his rule. He also wrote the play Mattavilasa Prahasana.

The Pallava kingdom began to gain both in territory and influence and were a regional power by the end of the 6th century, defeating kings of Ceylon and mainland Tamilakkam. Narasimhavarman I and Paramesvaravarman I stand out for their achievements in both military and architectural spheres. Narasimhavarman II built the Shore Temple.

 Simhavishnu (575–600)
 Mahendravarman I (600–630)
 Narasimhavarman I (Mamalla) (630–668)
 Mahendravarman II (668–672)
 Paramesvaravarman I (670–695)
 Narasimhavarman II (Raja Simha) (695–722)
 Paramesvaravarman II (705–710)

Later Pallavas of the Kadava Line 
The kings that came after Paramesvaravarman II belonged to the collateral line of Pallavas and were descendants of Bhimavarman, the brother of Simhavishnu. They called themselves as Kadavas, Kadavesa and Kaduvetti. Hiranyavarman, the father of Nandivarman Pallavamalla is said to have belonged to the Kadavakula in epigraphs. Nandivarman II himself is described as "one who was born to raise the prestige of the Kadava family".
Nandivarman II (Pallavamalla) (732–796) son of Hiranyavarman of Kadavakula
 Dantivarman (795–846)
 Nandivarman III (846–869)
 Aparajitavarman (879–897)

Aiyangar chronology

According to the available inscriptions of the Pallavas, historian S. Krishnaswami Aiyangar proposes the Pallavas could be divided into four separate families or dynasties; some of whose connections are known and some unknown. Aiyangar states  We have a certain number of charters in Prakrit of which three are important ones. Then follows a dynasty which issued their charters in Sanskrit; following this came the family of the great Pallavas beginning with Simha Vishnu; this was followed by a dynasty of the usurper Nandi Varman, another great Pallava. We are overlooking for the present the dynasty of the Ganga-Pallavas postulated by the Epigraphists. The earliest of these Pallava charters is the one known as the Mayidavolu 1 (Guntur district) copper-plates.

Based on a combination of dynastic plates and grants from the period, Aiyangar proposed their rule thus:

Early Pallavas
 Bappadevan (250–275)married a Naga of Mavilanga (Kanchi) – The Great Founder of a Pallava lineage
 Shivaskandavarman I (275–300)
 Simhavarman (300–320)
 Bhuddavarman (320–335)
 Bhuddyankuran (335–340)

Middle Pallavas
 Visnugopa (340–355) (Yuvamaharaja Vishnugopa)
 Kumaravisnu I (355–370)
 Skanda Varman II (370–385)
 Vira Varman (385–400)
 Skanda Varman III (400–435)
 Simha Varman II (435–460)
 Skanda Varman IV (460–480)
 Nandi Varman I (480–500)
 Kumaravisnu II ( 500–510)
 Buddha Varman ( 510–520)
 Kumaravisnu III ( 520–530)
 Simha Varman III ( 530–537)

Later Pallavas
Simhavishnu (537–570)
Mahendravarman I (571–630)
Narasimhavarman I (Mamalla) (630–668)
Mahendravarman II (668–672)
Paramesvaravarman I (672–700)
Narasimhavarman II (Raja Simha) (700–727)
Paramesvaravarman II (705–710)

Later Pallavas of the Kadava Line 
Nandivarman II (Pallavamalla) (732–796) son of Hiranyavarman of Kadavakula
Dantivarman (775–825)
Nandivarman III (825–869)
Nirupathungan (869–882)
Aparajitavarman (882–896)

Genealogy of Māmallapuram Praśasti

The genealogy of Pallavas mentioned in the Māmallapuram Praśasti is as follows:
 Vishnu
 Brahma
 Unknown / undecipherable
 Unknown / undecipherable
 Bharadvaja
 Drona
 Ashvatthaman
 Pallava
 Unknown / undecipherable
 Unknown / undecipherable
 Simhavarman I ( 275)
 Unknown / undecipherable
 Unknown / undecipherable
 Simhavarman IV (436– 460)
 Unknown / undecipherable
 Unknown / undecipherable
 Skandashishya
 Unknown / undecipherable
 Unknown / undecipherable
 Simhavisnu ( 550–585)
 Mahendravarman I ( 571–630)
 Maha-malla Narasimhavarman I (630–668)
 Unknown / undecipherable
 Paramesvaravarman I (669–690)
 Rajasimha Narasimhavaram II (690–728)
 Unknown / undecipherable
 Pallavamalla Nandivarman II (731–796)
 Unknown / undecipherable
 Nandivarman III (846–869)

Relation with the Cholas 
According to historian S. Krishnaswami Aiyengar, the Pallavas were natives of Tondaimandalam and the name Pallava is identical with the word Tondaiyar. Chola Prince Ilandiraiyan is traditionally regarded as the founder of the Pallava dynasty. Ilandiraiyan is referred to in the literature of the Sangam period such as the Pathupattu. In the Sangam epic Manimekalai, he is depected as the son of Chola king Killi and the Naga princess Pilivalai, the daughter of king Valaivanan of Manipallavam. When the boy grew up the princess wanted to send her son to the Chola kingdom. So she entrusted the prince to a merchant who dealt in woolen blankets called Kambala Chetty when his ship stopped in the island of Manipallavam. During the voyage to the Chola kingdom, the ship was wrecked due to rough weather and the boy was lost. He was later found washed ashore with a Tondai twig (creeper) around his leg. So he came to be called Tondaiman Ilam Tiraiyan meaning the young one of the seas or waves. When he grew up the northern part of the Chola kingdom was entrusted to him and the area he governed came to be called Tondaimandalam after him.He was a poet himself and four of his songs are extant even today.  He ruled from Tondaimandalam and was known as "Tondaman."

Other relationships
Pallava royal lineages were influential in the old kingdom of Kedah of the Malay Peninsula under Rudravarman I, Champa under Bhadravarman I and the Kingdom of the Funan in Cambodia. Some historians have claimed the present Pallar caste are descendants of the Pallavas who ruled the Andhra and Tamil countries between the 6th and 9th centuries. Tamil scholar M. Srinivasa Iyengar claimed the Pallars were one of the communities who served often in Pallava armies.

The similarity of the name ending "-varman" of Pallava rulers with that of Hindu kings during the Hindu/Buddhist era of Indonesia such as king Mulavarman of the Kutai Martadipura Kingdom, king Purnawarman of the Tarumanagara kingdom, king Adityawarman of the Malayapura kingdom, etc. has been commented upon by historians since discovery. There have been possible high relations and connections of the Hindu kingdoms of Indonesia with the Pallava dynasty and other Hindu and Buddhist kingdoms of India back then.

List of feudatories 
 Salankayana dynasty

See also
 List of Tamil monarchs
Kadava dynasty
Pallar

Notes

References

External links

 

History of Tamil Nadu
History of Andhra Pradesh
Pallava dynasty
Tamil monarchs
History of Tiruchirappalli
States and territories established in the 270s
States and territories disestablished in the 890s
3rd-century establishments in India
9th-century disestablishments in India
Telugu monarchs
Hindu dynasties